IA5 or similar may refer to:
 Iowa Highway 5, a highway in the southern part of the U.S. state of Iowa
 Iowa's 5th congressional district, a congressional district in the U.S. state of Iowa
 International Reference Alphabet, formerly International Alphabet No. 5, a character set encoding defined by the International Telecommunication Union
 Galaxy 25, formerly Intelsat Americas 5, a medium-powered communications satellite